Penfield is an unincorporated community in Clearfield County, Pennsylvania, United States. Penfield has a post office with ZIP code 15849.

References

Unincorporated communities in Clearfield County, Pennsylvania
Unincorporated communities in Pennsylvania